Rabbi Shimon ben Pazi, also known as Rabbi Simon, was an amora of the third generation. He was a student of Rabbi Yochanan and Rabbi Yehoshua ben Levi. He is commonly called Rabbi Shimon ben Pazi in the Babylonian Talmud, and Rabbi Simon in the Jerusalem Talmud and midrashim. He lived in the south of the Land of Israel, but also visited Tiberias, where he studied with Rabbi Yochanan. He was the first to use the phrase tiqqun soferim, and the first to enumerate God's 13 attributes of mercy.

References

 Yehuda David Eisenstein, Otzar Yisrael - Helek 7 - p.179

Talmud rabbis of the Land of Israel
Jews and Judaism in the Roman Empire